BattleGoat Studios is a Canadian software developer founded in 2000.  They were formed to develop the PC Game title Supreme Ruler 2010, which is a new updated version of a game concept originally developed by George Geczy in 1982, a text-based strategy video game called Supreme Ruler released for the Radio Shack TRS-80 computer.

Supreme Ruler 2010 was released in May 2005 and has received widespread recognition and awards including the 2006 Canadian Awards for the Electronic & Animated Arts Elan for "Best PC Game".

In October 2006 BattleGoat Studios announced that work had begun on a sequel to their first title.  Supreme Ruler 2020 was released in June 2008, published by Paradox Interactive.  An Expansion Pack, titled Supreme Ruler 2020: Global Crisis was announced in October 2008 and released in December of the same year.  A Gold Edition containing both products was released in September 2009.

On August 19, 2010, BattleGoat and Paradox Interactive announced a new game in the Supreme Ruler series, Supreme Ruler Cold War.  Based on the Cold War era from the late 1940s to the early 1990s, this will mark the studio's first historically based game.

BattleGoat Studios was co-founded in 2000 by David Thompson and George Geczy to "develop Intelligent Strategy Games".  The design team has stated that it "firmly believes that PC Strategy Gamers are looking for more sophisticated games that also remain fun to play".  As such, the Supreme Ruler titles are detailed and heavily researched, a cross between computer wargames and in-depth geo-political strategy games.

The core team at BattleGoat Studios also includes game designer Christian Latour as well as Graphic Artist Stephane Corre.

Games developed

References

External links
BattleGoat Studios
BattleGoat Studios Forums
SupremeWiki
Supreme Ruler 2010 official website
Supreme Ruler 2020 official website

Video game development companies
Companies based in Hamilton, Ontario
Video game companies of Canada
2000 establishments in Ontario
Canadian companies established in 2000
Video game companies established in 2000